NCAA Football 09 is a college football video game created by EA Sports, a subsidiary of Electronic Arts. It is the successor to NCAA Football 08 in the NCAA Football series. The game was announced on February 14, 2008 and was released on July 15, 2008 for the PlayStation 2, PlayStation 3, PlayStation Portable, Wii, and Xbox 360. The Wii version of the game is titled NCAA Football 09 All-Play and launched under EA Sports' new All-Play brand exclusive to the platform.

New features 
EA Tiburon made several additions and modifications to the game from previous editions.
 A new animation system has been put in place, whereby players are no longer locked into an animation. This allows players to chain together various moves, enabling a more fluid style of play.
 After throwing an interception, the player is allowed to answer a "Quarterback Quiz". The player is given several pictures – representing photos taken by the offensive coordinator – and is presented with three choices of defensive schemes to select. This new feature is solely for the controller/player to understand and read the defense.
 Quarterbacks playing on the road can be rattled by home crowds, forcing them to misread routes or completely forget plays. This effect is  not amplified with an incorrect guess on the "Quarterback Quiz".
 Players can give coaching strategies, whereby the entire offense or defense will focus on a single action, such as forcing a turnover or ignoring the crowd noise.
 Players can call a timeout before a key field goal or extra point attempt to "ice" the kicker, which will overlay the kick meter with a sheet of ice, change the camera angle to a more dramatic view, cause the player's controller to shake violently, and give an audible heartbeat sound effect, which matches the pulse of the controller's rumble.
 There are new, school-specific celebrations, many of which involve the school's mascot.
 School-specific custom stadium sounds can be added from MP3s loaded on your gaming system's hard drive. Numerous user-created websites have popped up to facilitate this feature.
 The new "Coke Zero Mascot Mash Up" mode, where teams are made up entirely of the school's mascot. In this mode, ball-handling maneuvers are more fantasy-oriented, allowing the player to perform flips rather than typical jukes and spins.
 Mini-games allow for playing "H-O-R-S-E" with field goal kicks.
 Online Dynasty Mode with support for up to 12 players across Xbox Live or PlayStation Network.
 Ball trails and turbo trails for the Wii version.
 Freshman (PSP) and Family Play (PS2) modes simplify gameplay to single button presses, while also telling the novice player when to actually press the button to perform an action. The game will also suggest plays to run in specific situations.

Cover
In order to promote its new Wii version of NCAA Football, EA held a competition from February 14, 2008 until March 14, 2008, allowing for fans to vote on their favorite NCAA Division I FBS college team mascot (with the University of Montana's Monte the lone FCS representative). The winner of the competition, Michigan State's mascot Sparty, is featured on the cover art for the Wii.

Each of the other four versions of the game features a different athlete on the cover. All are former collegiate players, as the use of an active student athlete is against NCAA regulations.

 Former Arkansas running back Darren McFadden is the cover athlete for the Xbox 360.
 Former Boston College quarterback Matt Ryan is the cover athlete for the PS3.
 Former California wide receiver DeSean Jackson is the cover athlete for the PS2.
 Former West Virginia fullback Owen Schmitt is the cover athlete for the PSP.

Demo
A contest was released June 19 at the Xbox Live Marketplace (Xbox 360) and PlayStation Store (PlayStation 3). The teams are Ohio State Buckeyes and the LSU Tigers
and with 2 minute quarters at varsity level. A mascot game is also available with the Florida Gators versus the Texas Longhorns.

Retired Online Play
On February 5, 2011, EA retired online play for several old games, including NCAA Football 09 for all platforms.

Reception

The PS3 and Xbox 360 versions of NCAA Football 09 were generally well received by critics, earning scores of 81/100 and 83/100, respectively. However, the Wii versions received mixed to negative reactions.

References

2008 video games
PlayStation Portable games
PlayStation 2 games
PlayStation 3 games
Xbox 360 games
Wii games
College football video games
Video games developed in Canada
Electronic Arts games
EA Sports games
Sports video games with career mode
High school American football video games
North America-exclusive video games
Multiplayer and single-player video games
NCAA video games
Video games developed in the United States